The Alliance Française of Port Elizabeth is a South African non-profit organisation supported by the French Embassy in South Africa.

History 
The team is composed of a committee of around 10 members, a director appointed by the French Embassy, staff, and teachers.

The Alliance occupies a Victorian style house in the historic site of Richmond Hill. It has three classrooms, a café, a gallery as well as a library. South Africa's former Prime Minister and later President, John Vorster, was once a border in the house. He was an attorney in Port Elizabeth prior to his detention in the Baakens Street police station for his Ossewa-Brandwag organisation activities.

The Alliance is primarily a language School, a cultural centre, and then a French consular agency. In addition to French classes and Xhosa classes, they organise monthly socio-cultural activities.

Official Diplomas 

DELF (Diplôme d'Etudes en Langue Française) and DALF (Diplôme approfondi de langue française) are official qualifications delivered by the French Department of Education to certify competencies of non-French native speakers in the French language.

DELF and DALF qualifications are internationally recognised, they are consistent with international standards for the test development and the Common European Framework of Reference for Languages. The DELF and DALF consist of 6 levels, each independently recognised as a diploma. Candidates can choose their examination according to their level. They may also sit the examinations for more than one diploma during the same examination session.

References

External links 
 Fondation des Alliances Françaises
 French Embassy in South Africa
 Institut Français

Port Elizabeth
Organizations established in 1960
Alliance Française
France–South Africa relations